The 2015 Qatar Open (also known as 2015 Qatar ExxonMobil Open for sponsorship reasons) was a men's tennis tournament played on outdoor hard courts. It was the 23rd edition of the Qatar Open, and part of the ATP World Tour 250 series of the 2015 ATP World Tour. It took place at the Khalifa International Tennis and Squash Complex in Doha, Qatar, from January 5 to 11, 2015.

Points and prize money

Point distribution

Prize money

Singles main-draw entrants

Seeds

1 Rankings as of December 29, 2014

Other entrants
The following players received wildcards into the singles main draw:
  Jabor Mohammed Ali Mutawa 
  Malek Jaziri 
  Mohamed Safwat

The following players received entry from the qualifying draw:
  Nikoloz Basilashvili
  Michael Berrer 
  Thiemo de Bakker
  Blaž Kavčič

Withdrawals
Before the tournament
  Nicolás Almagro → replaced by Ivan Dodig
  Ernests Gulbis → replaced by João Souza
  Dominic Thiem (flu) → replaced by Dustin Brown

ATP doubles main-draw entrants

Seeds

1 Rankings as of December 29, 2014

Other entrants
The following pairs received wildcards into the doubles main draw:
  Jabor Mohammed Ali Mutawa /  Malek Jaziri
  Novak Djokovic /  Filip Krajinović

Retirement
  Alexander Peya (left leg injury)

Champions

Singles 

  David Ferrer def.  Tomáš Berdych, 6–4, 7–5

Doubles 

  Juan Mónaco /  Rafael Nadal def.  Julian Knowle /  Philipp Oswald, 6–3, 6–4

References

External links 
 

 ]